El Hayat newspaper (in Arabic جريدة الحياة meaning The Life) is a daily newspaper independent in Algeria published Saturday to Thursday in the tabloid format.

History 
This newspaper is considered by some sources to be the first independent daily newspaper in Algeria to be issued by journalists who have not worked in the government press before and are not affiliated with any political party.

See also
 List of newspapers in Algeria

References

2013 establishments in Algeria
Arabic-language newspapers
Mass media in Algiers
Newspapers established in 2013
Newspapers published in Algeria